The modern constellation Octans is not included in the Three Enclosures and Twenty-Eight Mansions system of traditional Chinese uranography because its stars are too far south for observers in China to know about them before the introduction of Western star charts. Based on the work of Xu Guangqi and the German Jesuit missionary Johann Adam Schall von Bell in the late Ming Dynasty, this constellation has been classified under the 23 Southern Asterisms (近南極星區, Jìnnánjíxīngōu) with the names Snake's Tail (蛇尾, Shéwěi) and Exotic Bird (異雀, Yìquè).

The name of the western constellation in modern Chinese is 南極座 (nán jí zuò), meaning "the south pole constellation".

Stars
The map of Chinese constellation in constellation Octans area consists of:

See also
Chinese astronomy
Traditional Chinese star names
Chinese constellations

References

Astronomy in China
Octans